Indiana Little (1897-1970) was an activist for the voting rights of Black Americans. She is most well known for leading a large march to the voting registrar's office in Birmingham, Alabama on Monday, 18 January 1926. The numbers at the march range from hundreds to one thousand. Little was arrested and released on a bond of $300 or $ in USD today.

Biography 
Indiana Tuggle was born in Wyatt, Georgia 15 April 1897. Her parents were George and Harriet Tuggle, both of whom were farm laborers. She was the eighth of nine children. She went to school through seventh grade and could read and write. Tuggle married Terrell Little in 1918 and had two children in Georgia, Lessie and Elease, before moving to Birmingham in 1923.

Black suffrage

Background 
Even though the 19th amendment was ratified in 1920, white officials in Birmingham and throughout the Southern United States did not allow Black people to vote. Threats of violence and intimidation from white citizens kept Black people, particularly women, from exercising their legal right to the ballet. 

Little quickly became known as a prominent and well-respected member of the Black community in Birmingham.

January 1926 march 
On 18 January 1926, after having been denied the right to vote a week before, Little led between a few hundred and one thousand Black men and women to the voting registrar's office in an attempt to get Black citizens registered to vote. At the office Little stated: "I am a free-born citizen of America and by the fourteenth amendment of the U.S. Constitution I shall not be denied the right to vote because of race, color, or sex, and I will not move until I have been registered." Little charged the board of registrars with giving intelligence tests to Black people but not white people, thus discriminating against Black people who had had education withheld from them.

She and those who accompanied her were not allowed to register and she was arrested and beat for her attempt. While in prison she was manhandled and struck. Her bail was posted at $300, a value of $ now, and she was released. Her march and arrest sparked nation-wide debate in newspapers through 1930 and inspired subsequent marches in later years.

Late life and death 
Little remained in Birmingham to her death and stayed active in her community and church. She was president of the Missionary Society, a Sunday school teacher, and the Training Union teacher at the 23rd Street Baptist Church. She was finally registered to vote at 55 and voted for the first time in 1957. She died 22 September 1970.

References 

People from Georgia (U.S. state)
Baptists from Georgia (U.S. state)
Activists from Birmingham, Alabama
American political activists
African-American suffragists
American suffragists
Alabama suffrage
American community activists
1897 births
1970 deaths